Malcolm Charles Barber (born 4 March 1943) is a British scholar of medieval history, described as the world's leading living expert on the Knights Templar. He is considered to have written the two most comprehensive books on the subject, The Trial of the Templars (1978) and The New Knighthood: A History of the Order of the Temple (1994).  He has been an editor for The Journal of Medieval History and written many articles on the Templars, the Cathars, various elements of the Crusades, and the reign of Philip IV of France.

Biography
Born in 1943, Barber attended Walpole Grammar School in Ealing from 1954–1961, followed by the University of Nottingham from 1961–1966, where he received his first-class degree in 1964. His post-grad studies were under Bernard Hamilton in the area of grandmasters of the Templars. Barber attended the British School at Rome from 1965–1966, then was appointed assistant lecturer at the University of Reading in 1966. He received his PhD in 1968 from the University of Nottingham.

Barber was a Professor of Medieval European History in the Faculty of Arts and Humanities at the University of Reading in the UK, until his retirement in September 2004.

Positions
 Director of the Graduate Centre for Medieval Studies at Reading, 1986–1989
 British Academy Research Readership, 1989–1991
 Leverhulme Research Fellowship, 1997–1998
 Senior Fellowship, National Humanities Center, North Carolina, 1998–1999

Journal editor
 (with P. Noble and J. Norton-Smith), Reading Medieval Studies, 1977–1985
 Annual Bulletin of the Society for the Study of the Crusade and the Latin East, 1986–1990
 The Journal of Medieval History, 1996–2002

Works
 The Trial of the Templars, Cambridge University Press. 1st edition, 1978.  2nd edition, 2006
 The Two Cities. Medieval Europe 1050-1320. Routledge. 1st edition, 1992.  2nd edition, 2004
 The New Knighthood. A History of the Order of the Temple. Cambridge University Press, 1994
 Crusaders and Heretics, Twelfth to Fourteenth Centuries. Collected Studies. Aldershot, 1995
 The Cathars. Dualist Heretics in Languedoc in the High Middle Ages. Longman, 2000
 The Crusader States. Yale University Press, 2012

Edited
 The Military Orders. Fighting for the Faith and Caring for the Sick. Variorum, 1994
 (with K. Bate), The Templars, Manchester University Press, 2002
 (with M. Ailes), The History of the Holy War. Ambroise's Estoire de la Guerre Sainte, 2 volumes. The Boydell Press, 2003.

Notes

References

 Reading University biography
 Staff listing at Reading University
 Graduate Centre for Medieval Studies

20th-century English historians
1943 births
Living people
Place of birth missing (living people)
Historians of the Knights Templar
Alumni of the University of Nottingham
Academics of the University of Reading
Corresponding Fellows of the Medieval Academy of America